The Vampires Night Orgy is a 1972 Spanish horror film directed by León Klimovsky.

Cast 
 Jack Taylor as Luis
 Dyanik Zurakowska as Alma 
 José Guardiola as Mayor
 Charo Soriano as Raquel
 Helga Liné as La Señora
 Manuel de Blas as Marcos
 David Aller as César
 Luis Ciges as Godó

References

External links 

Spanish vampire films
1972 horror films
1972 films
1970s Spanish films